One Determined Heart is the debut studio album by Australian recording artist Paulini, released through Sony BMG Australia on 23 July 2004. The album produced by Audius Mtawarira and recorded by Louise Wheatley, mostly features cover songs by Jeff Healey, The Tymes, TLC, Brownstone, Four Tops, Barbra Streisand, Jeff Buckley, Bonnie Raitt, Phil Collins and Whitney Houston. One Determined Heart debuted at number one on the ARIA Albums Chart and was certified platinum by the Australian Recording Industry Association (ARIA), for shipments of 70,000 copies. The album was preceded by the lead single "Angel Eyes", which peaked at number one on the ARIA Singles Chart and was also certified platinum. Paulini earned ARIA No. 1 Chart Awards for both "Angel Eyes" and One Determined Heart. The second single "We Can Try" was released in October 2004 and peaked at number 30 on the ARIA Singles Chart.

Singles
A cover of Jeff Healey's "Angel Eyes" was released physically on 5 July 2004, as the lead single from One Determined Heart. The song peaked at number one on the ARIA Singles Chart for three consecutive weeks and was certified platinum by the Australian Recording Industry Association (ARIA), for shipments of 70,000 copies. It earned Paulini an ARIA No. 1 Chart Award and a nomination for "Highest Selling Single" at the 2004 ARIA Music Awards.

One of the album's original songs, "We Can Try", was released physically on 4 October 2004, as the second single from the album. The song peaked at number 30 on the ARIA Singles Chart.

Chart performance
One Determined Heart debuted on the ARIA Albums Chart at number one on 2 August 2004, where it remained for two consecutive weeks. The album was certified platinum by the ARIA.

Track listing

Charts and certifications

Weekly charts

Year-end charts

Certifications

Release history

References

2004 debut albums
Paulini albums
Sony Music Australia albums